Second Street Historic District is a national historic district located at Albemarle, Stanly County, North Carolina. The district encompasses 12 contributing buildings in the central business district of Albemarle.  They were built between about 1898 and 1950 and include notable examples of Early Commercial and Late Gothic Revival style architecture.  Notable buildings include The Alameda Theater (1916), Albemarle Hotel (1923), First Presbyterian Church (1924), (former) U.S. Post Office (1936), First Baptist Church (1919), Wilhelm Service Station (1950), Central Methodist Church (1908), City Hall (1938), and Hearne Building (1906).

It was added to the National Register of Historic Places in 2005.

References

Historic districts on the National Register of Historic Places in North Carolina
Gothic Revival architecture in North Carolina
Buildings and structures in Stanly County, North Carolina
National Register of Historic Places in Stanly County, North Carolina